SMS Teodo was a 6,561 ton collier built in 1915 for the Austro-Hungarian Navy. She was ceded to Italy in 1921 as a war reparation. She was renamed Barbana in 1924 and Barbana G in 1926. In 1940, she was seized by the United Kingdom and renamed Empire Airman.

History
SMS Teodo was built by Stabilimento Tecnico Triestino,  Trieste as yard number 501 and launched on 8 January 1913, being completed  on 17 February 1916. SMS Teodo was a Pola Class collier of the Austro-Hungarian Navy. At the end of the First World War, under Article 137 of the Treaty of Saint-Germain, SMS Teodo was classed as a merchant ship and passed to the Italian Government Ministry of Transport. In 1924, she was passed to the Italian Ministry of Marine, and renamed Barbana. In 1926, she was sold to the Società Anonima di Navigazione Garibaldi, Genoa and renamed Barbana G. On 6 November 1929, she collided with the Italian cargo ship  in the Nieuwe Waterweg at Rotterdam, South Holland, Netherlands. Atlantide was consequently beached. Barbana G was captured off Leith and taken to Methil on 10 June 1940 and passed to the Ministry of War Transport, being renamed Empire Airman under the management of Mark Whitwill & Sons Ltd, Bristol.

Convoys
HX 72
Convoy HX 72 sailed from Halifax, Nova Scotia on 9 September 1940. Empire Airman was carrying a cargo of iron ore, she was bound for Cardiff. At 00:22 on 22 September, Empire Airman was hit by a torpedo fired by U-100. Thirty three of the thirty seven crew were killed in the attack. Four survivors were rescued by HMS La Malouine. Those lost on Empire Airman are commemorated at the Tower Hill Memorial, London.

Official number and code letters
Official Numbers were a forerunner to IMO Numbers.

Barbana G had the Official Number 1496 on the Italian register. Empire Airman had the Official Number 165788 on Lloyds Register.

Barbana G used the Code Letters NFVZ. Empire Airman used the Code Letters GLZT

References

External links
List of dead from Empire Airman 

Pola-class colliers
1915 ships
Ships built in Trieste
World War I naval ships of Austria-Hungary
Steamships of Austria-Hungary
Merchant ships of Italy
Steamships of Italy
Maritime incidents in 1929
World War II merchant ships of Italy
Maritime incidents in June 1940
Ministry of War Transport ships
Steamships of the United Kingdom
Ships sunk by German submarines in World War II
Maritime incidents in September 1940
Captured ships
Shipwrecks of Ireland